The Fimi River is a river in the Democratic Republic of the Congo. It flows from Lake Mai-Ndombe to the Kasai River, which in turn empties into the Congo. One of the Fimi's tributaries is the Lukenie River, which is navigable by barges as far as Kole.

Rivers of the Democratic Republic of the Congo
Kasai River